Alphonso "Buck" Johnson Jr. (born January 3, 1964) is a retired American professional basketball player. Johnson, a 6'7" small forward, played seven seasons in the National Basketball Association (NBA) for the Houston Rockets and Washington Bullets. After playing in the NBA, he spent his next ten professional seasons playing abroad for various teams, in top leagues around the world.

High school career
Johnson played high school basketball at, and graduated from, Hayes High School in Birmingham, Alabama.

College career
Johnson played college basketball at the University of Alabama, with the Alabama Crimson Tide, from 1982 to 1986.

Professional career
Johnson was drafted by the Houston Rockets in the first round (20th pick overall) of the 1986 NBA draft. Johnson played in 7 NBA seasons, from 1986 to 1993. He played for the Rockets from 1986 to 1992, and for the Washington Bullets during the 1992–93 season.

Johnson's best year as a pro came during the 1989–90 season, as a member of the Rockets, when he appeared in 82 games, and averaged 14.8 points per game. In his NBA career, Johnson played in 505 games, and scored a total of 4,617 points.

National team career
Johnson won a gold medal with Team USA's Under-19 junior national team, at the 1983 FIBA Under-19 World Cup. In eight games played at the tournament, he averaged 15.8 points per game.

References

External links
nba.com Historical Profile
Player Profile @ acb.com 
Player Profile @ Fibaeurope.com

1964 births
Living people
20th-century African-American sportspeople
21st-century African-American people
African-American basketball players
Alabama Crimson Tide men's basketball players
American expatriate basketball people in Greece
American expatriate basketball people in Israel
American expatriate basketball people in Spain
American expatriate basketball people in Turkey
Apollon Patras B.C. players
Basketball players from Birmingham, Alabama
American men's basketball players
CB Girona players
Dafnis B.C. players
Greek Basket League players
Hapoel Tel Aviv B.C. players
Houston Rockets draft picks
Houston Rockets players
Iraklis Thessaloniki B.C. players
Israeli Basketball Premier League players
Liga ACB players
Maccabi Tel Aviv B.C. players
McDonald's High School All-Americans
Parade High School All-Americans (boys' basketball)
Peristeri B.C. players
Power forwards (basketball)
Small forwards
Tofaş S.K. players
Washington Bullets players
Wichita Falls Texans players